Associazione Sportiva Dilettantistica Chieri is an Italian association football club, founded in 1955 and based in Chieri, Piedmont. The team currently plays in Serie D Girone A.

The team's colors are white and light blue.

Honors 
 Coppa Italia Serie D
 Champions: 2016–17

References

External links 

Football clubs in Piedmont and Aosta Valley
Association football clubs established in 1955
1955 establishments in Italy
Chieri